Aleksandar Stanković (born 3 August 2005) is a Serbian professional footballer who plays as a midfielder for Serie A club Inter Milan. He is the son of former Inter Milan and Serbia footballer Dejan Stanković.

Career
He made his debut in the Inter Milan first team match day squad being named on the substitute bench for Inter on 1 October, 2022 for a Serie A match against AS Roma at the San Siro.

Style of play
Whilst he was captaining the Serbia U17 team to the semi-finals of the 2022 UEFA European Under-17 Championship, Stanković was described by the UEFA website as having set-piece delivery that would “be a menace to any opponent” and a “blend of finesse and fight in midfield [which] makes it clear why he wears the captain's armband.”

International career
In February 2020 Stanković was called up to the Serbia U15 squad. Stanković represented Serbia Under16 and Serbia U17 and captained the youth team for the first time in May 2021. He captained the Serbian team that reached the semi-finals of the 2022 UEFA European Under-17 Championship. In September 2022 he was called up for the first time, and played as captain, for the Serbia U18 national team in a 1-0 defeat against Italy U18. Against the same opponent 4 days later he scored the first goal in a 2-1 win for his country.

Personal life
His brother Filip plays as a goalkeeper for FC Volendam, on loan from Inter Milan. They are both sons of former Inter and Serbia footballer Dejan Stanković. His mother Ana is Slovenian and the family spend a lot of time in Ljubljana. His maternal uncle is a Slovenian former professional footballer Milenko Ačimovič.

References

External links

2005 births
Living people
Footballers from Milan
Italian footballers
Italian people of Serbian descent
Serbian footballers
Serbian people of Slovenian descent
Serbia youth international footballers
Inter Milan players